Paul Adolphe Marie Prosper Granier de Cassagnac (1843, Paris1904, Saint-Viâtre) was the son of Adolphe Granier de Cassagnac and Rosa de Beaupin de Beauvalon, and while still young associated with his father in both politics and journalism. In 1866 he became editor of the Conservative paper Le Pays, and figured in a long series of political duels. On the declaration of war in 1870 he volunteered for service and was taken prisoner at Sedan.

On his return from captivity in a fortress in Silesia he continued to defend the Bonapartist cause in Le Pays, against both Republicans and Royalists. Elected deputy for the department of Gers in 1876, he adopted in the chamber a policy of obstruction "to discredit the republican régime". In 1877 he openly encouraged MacMahon to attempt a Bonapartist coup d'état, but the marshal's refusal and the death of the Prince Imperial foiled his hopes. Afterwards he played but a secondary rôle in the chamber, and occupied himself mostly with the direction of the journal L'Autorité, which he had founded. He was not re-elected in 1902, and died in November 1904. His sons took over L'Autorité and the belligerent traditions of the family.

His cousin, with whom he had numerous feuds, was Prosper-Olivier Lissagaray; Adolphe Granier de Cassagnac's mother, Ursule (1775–1850) was sister of Lissagaray's father Laurent.

References

 

1843 births
1904 deaths
Politicians from Paris
French nobility
Appel au peuple
Members of the 1st Chamber of Deputies of the French Third Republic
Members of the 2nd Chamber of Deputies of the French Third Republic
Members of the 3rd Chamber of Deputies of the French Third Republic
Members of the 4th Chamber of Deputies of the French Third Republic
Members of the 5th Chamber of Deputies of the French Third Republic
Members of the 7th Chamber of Deputies of the French Third Republic
French journalists
French newspaper founders
French male writers
French military personnel of the Franco-Prussian War